Francis Eugene Kelleher (August 22, 1916 – April 13, 1979) was an outfielder in Major League Baseball. He played for the Cincinnati Reds.

For his success in the minor leagues, Kelleher is a member of the Pacific Coast League Hall of Fame.

External links

1916 births
1979 deaths
Akron Yankees players
Baseball players from San Francisco
Cincinnati Reds players
Hollywood Stars players
Kansas City Blues (baseball) players
Major League Baseball outfielders
Newark Bears (IL) players
Oakland Oaks (baseball) players
Saint Mary's Gaels baseball players
Seattle Rainiers players
Syracuse Chiefs players